Chromosome 15 is one of the 23 pairs of chromosomes in humans. People normally have two copies of this chromosome. Chromosome 15 spans about 99.7 million base pairs (the building material of DNA) and represents between 3% and 3.5% of the total DNA in cells. Chromosome 15 is an acrocentric chromosome, with a very small short arm (the "p" arm, for "petite"), which contains few protein coding genes among its 19 million base pairs. It has a larger long arm (the "q" arm) that is gene rich, spanning about 83 million base pairs.

The human leukocyte antigen gene for β2-microglobulin is found on chromosome 15, as well as the FBN1 gene, coding for both fibrillin-1 (a protein critical to the proper functioning of connective tissue), and aprosin (a small protein produced from part of the transcribed FBN1 gene mRNA), which is involved in fat metabolism.

Genes

Number of genes 
The following are some of the gene count estimates of human chromosome 15. Because researchers use different approaches to genome annotation their predictions of the number of genes on each chromosome varies (for technical details, see gene prediction). Among various projects, the collaborative consensus coding sequence project (CCDS) takes an extremely conservative strategy. So CCDS's gene number prediction represents a lower bound on the total number of human protein-coding genes.

Gene list 

The following is a partial list of genes on human chromosome 15. For complete list, see the link in the infobox on the right.

Chromosomal conditions 
The following conditions are caused by mutations in chromosome 15. Two of the conditions (Angelman syndrome and Prader–Willi syndrome) involve a loss of gene activity in the same part of chromosome 15, the 15q11.2-q13.1 region.  This discovery provided the first evidence in humans that something beyond genes could determine how the genes are expressed.

Angelman syndrome 
  

The main characteristics of Angelman syndrome are severe intellectual disability, ataxia, lack of speech, and excessively happy demeanor. Angelman syndrome results from a loss of gene activity in a specific part of chromosome 15, the 15q11-q13 region. This region contains a gene called UBE3A that, when mutated or absent, likely causes the characteristic features of this condition. People normally have two copies of the UBE3A gene, one from each parent. Both copies of this gene are active in many of the body's tissues. In the brain, however, only the copy inherited from a person's mother (the maternal copy) is active. If the maternal copy is lost because of a chromosomal change or a gene mutation, a person will have no working copies of the UBE3A gene in the brain.

In most cases (about 70%), people with Angelman syndrome have a deletion in the maternal copy of chromosome 15. This chromosomal change deletes the region of chromosome 15 that includes the UBE3A gene. Because the copy of the UBE3A gene inherited from a person's father (the paternal copy) is normally inactive in the brain, a deletion in the maternal chromosome 15 results in no active copies of the UBE3A gene in the brain.

In 3% to 7% of cases, Angelman syndrome occurs when a person has two copies of the paternal chromosome 15 instead of one copy from each parent. This phenomenon is called paternal uniparental disomy (UPD). People with paternal UPD for chromosome 15 have two copies of the UBE3A gene, but they are both inherited from the father and are therefore inactive in the brain.

About 10% of Angelman syndrome cases are caused by a mutation in the UBE3A gene, and another 3% result from a defect in the DNA region that controls the activation of the UBE3A gene and other genes on the maternal copy of chromosome 15. In a small percentage of cases, Angelman syndrome may be caused by a chromosomal rearrangement called a translocation or by a mutation in a gene other than UBE3A. These genetic changes can abnormally inactivate the UBE3A gene.

Angelman syndrome can be hereditary, as evidenced by one case where a patient became pregnant with a daughter who also had the condition.

Prader–Willi syndrome 
 

The main characteristics of this condition include polyphagia (extreme, insatiable appetite), mild to moderate developmental delay, hypogonadism resulting in delayed to no puberty, and hypotonia. Prader-Willi syndrome is caused by the loss of active genes in a specific part of chromosome 15, the 15q11-q13 region. People normally have two copies of this chromosome in each cell, one copy from each parent. Prader–Willi syndrome occurs when the paternal copy is partly or entirely missing.

In about 70% of cases, Prader–Willi syndrome occurs when the 15q11-q13 region of the paternal chromosome 15 is deleted. The genes in this region are normally active on the paternal copy of the chromosome and are inactive on the maternal copy. Therefore, a person with a deletion in the paternal chromosome 15 will have no active genes in this region.

In about 25% of cases, a person with Prader–Willi syndrome has two maternal copies of chromosome 15 in each cell instead of one copy from each parent. This phenomenon is called maternal uniparental disomy. Because some genes are normally active only on the paternal copy of this chromosome, a person with two maternal copies of chromosome 15 will have no active copies of these genes.

In a small percentage of cases, Prader–Willi syndrome is not caused by a chromosomal rearrangement called a translocation. Rarely, the condition is caused by an abnormality in the DNA region that controls the activity of genes on the paternal chromosome 15. Because patients almost always have difficulty reproducing, Prader–Willi syndrome is generally not hereditary.

Isodicentric chromosome 15 
 

A specific chromosomal change called an isodicentric chromosome 15 (IDIC15) (also known by a number of other names) can affect growth and development. The patient possesses an "extra" or "marker" chromosome. This small extra chromosome is made up of genetic material from chromosome 15 that has been abnormally duplicated (copied) and attached end-to-end. In some cases, the extra chromosome is very small and has no effect on a person's health. A larger isodicentric chromosome 15 can result in weak muscle tone (hypotonia),  intellectual disability, seizures, and behavioral problems. Signs and symptoms of autism (a developmental disorder that affects communication and social interaction) have also been associated with the presence of an isodicentric chromosome 15.

Other chromosomal conditions 
Other changes in the number or structure of chromosome 15 can cause developmental delays, delayed growth and development, hypotonia, and characteristic facial features. These changes include an extra copy of part of chromosome 15 in each cell (partial trisomy 15) or a missing segment of the chromosome in each cell (partial monosomy 15). In some cases, several of the chromosome's DNA building blocks (nucleotides) are deleted or duplicated.

The following diseases are some of those related to genes on chromosome 15:
 Bloom syndrome
 Breast cancer
 Isovaleric acidemia
 Loeys–Dietz, type 3 (SMAD3 gene)
 Marfan syndrome
 Nonsyndromic deafness 
 Schaaf–Yang syndrome (SYS)
 Tay–Sachs disease
 Tyrosinemia
 Autosomal Dominant Compelling Helio-Ophthalmic Outburst syndrome

Cytogenetic band

References

Specific references:

General references:

External links

 
 

Chromosomes (human)